On 17 May 2009, local elections were held in Zagreb, the capital of Croatia. The incumbent mayor was Milan Bandić (elected in 2005), a representative of the Social Democratic Party of Croatia (SDP), also the leading party in the previous city council. Bandić was reelected mayor in the second round of the elections with 61.84% of the votes.

Mayor election

First round

Second round

Assembly election

See also
2009 Croatian local elections
List of mayors in Croatia
List of mayors of Zagreb

References

External links
 http://www.izbori.hr/2009Lokalni/rezultati/r_06_21_0021_000.html
 http://www.izbori.hr/2009Lokalni/rezultati/r_15_21_0021_000.html
 http://www.izbori.hr/2009Lokalni/rezultati2K/r_15_21_0021_000.html

Zagreb 2009
Elections in Zagreb
Zagreb
Zagreb
2000s in Zagreb